Livre des merveilles du monde may refer to:

 , a book by John Mandeville
 The Travels of Marco Polo, a 13th-century travelogue
 Livre des merveilles (BNF Fr2810), a 15th-century French illuminated manuscript
 Des merveilles du monde et principalemẽt des admirables choses des Indes & du nouveau monde, a 1553 work by Guillaume Postel